The Toulouse Spanish Film Festival, also known as Cinespaña, is an annual film festival held in Toulouse, France, which specialises in Spanish cinema. The festival awards the Golden Violet, for the best full-length film from Spain previously unreleased in France. The festival is usually held in October.

The festival was established in 1996, as the successor to the  film festival. The 1996 festival was focussed on the Spanish Civil War, with later festivals showcasing Spanish cinema in general.

Since 1997, the festival's main competition has presented full-length films from Spain previously unreleased in France, which compete for the Golden Violet award. There are also awards for best director, actress, actor, screenplay, score, and cinematography.

Golden Violet winning films

References 

Film festivals in France
Cinema of Spain
Toulouse
October events
Culture of Occitania (administrative region)